Chikkanandi is a village in Gokak Taluka of Belagavi district in the southern state of Karnataka, India. It is situated at a distance of 14 km from Gokak Taluka and approx 16 km from Yaragatti.

References

Villages in Belagavi district